Sergei Vyacheslavovich Kositsin (born 2 September 1995) is a Russian football player. He plays for FC Zenit-Izhevsk.

Club career
He made his debut in the Russian Football National League for FC Yenisey Krasnoyarsk on 2 May 2016 in a game against FC Tyumen.

References

External links
 Profile by Russian Football National League
 

1995 births
Sportspeople from Krasnoyarsk
Living people
Russian footballers
Association football defenders
FC Yenisey Krasnoyarsk players
FC Oryol players
FC Nosta Novotroitsk players
FC Rotor Volgograd players
FC Tambov players
FC Tekstilshchik Ivanovo players
FC Zenit-Izhevsk players
Russian Second League players
Russian First League players